Josué Yoroba Guébo, or Josué Guébo (born July 21, 1972), is an Ivorian academic and man of letters. A major figure of African contemporary poetry, he is also a short story writer, playwright, essayist and author of children's literature. 6th President of the Ivoirian Writers' Association (AECI), he is the recipient of the Bernard Dadié Grand Prize and the U Tam'si Prize.

Biography 
Josué Yoroba Guébo was born on July 21, 1972 in Abidjan, the economic capital of Côte d'Ivoire. He started writing poetry while still young. He wrote his first poem when he was twelve or thirteen years old. His interest for literature led him to read the works of Aimé Césaire or those of Paul Verlaine. He was also influenced by the great African writers he discovered during his school and university course.
Holder of a PhD in History and Philosophy of Sciences, Josué Guébo is also teacher-researcher.

Bibliography 
Poetry
 2009: L'or n'a jamais été un métal (Vallesse, Abidjan);
 2010: D'un mâle quelconque (Apopsix, Paris) ;
 2011: Carnet de doute (Panafrika/Silex/Nouvelles du sud, Dakar);
 2011: Mon pays, ce soir (Panafrika/Silex/Nouvelles du sud, Dakar);
 2014: Songe à Lampedusa (Panafrika/Silex/Nouvelles du sud, Paris);
 2015: L’Enfant qui disparaît est une lettre d’alphabet (Panafrika/Silex/Nouvelles du sud, Paris) ;
 2015: Dapidahoun, chantiers d'espérances (Les Editions du Net);
 2016: My country, tonight (Action Books), translated by Todd Fredson;
 2016: Aux chemins de Babo Naki (l'Harmattan, Paris);
 2017: Think of Lampedusa (ImprintUniversity of Nebraska Press), Introduction by John Keene, translated by Todd Fredson;

Children's Books
 2013: Le père Noël aime l'attiéké (Les classiques ivoiriens);
 2018: Le père Noël danse le Ziglibity (Eburnie édition);
 2018: Pourquoi l'homme, le chien et le chat parlent des langues différentes (Eburnie édition);
 2018: Destins de clandestins (Vallesse édition).

Essays
 2015: Une histoire de l'objectivité : L’objectivité dans les sciences, de Parménide à l’intelligence artificielle (Presses Académiques Francophones);
 2016: Les Sommeils des indépendances, Chroniques pour une Afrique intégrée (Harmattan Côte-d'Ivoire);
 2016: Dictionnaire des mots et expressions du français ivoirien (l'Harmattan, Paris);
 2018: Chroniques africaines et aphorismes (Dhart, Québec).

Theatre
 2016: Le blues des oranges (Les Editions du Net).

Collective Works
 2007: La paix par l'écriture (Vallesse, Abidjan);
 2010: Des paroles de Côte d'Ivoire pour Haïti, notre devoir de solidarité (Ceda/Nei);
 2013: Monsieur Mandela (Panafrika/Silex/Nouvelles du sud, Paris);
 2015: Ce soir quand tu verras Patrice (Panafrika/Silex/Nouvelles du sud, Paris);
 2017: Africa Study Bible, NLT (Tyndale house, Carol Stream, Illinois);
 2019: Dadié, l'homme de tous les continents. Cent écrivains du monde rendent hommage au centenaire vivant (Édtitions Eburnie, Abidjan).

Awards

Literary awards
 1998: Award of RFI writing contest " 3 heures pour écrire " (3 hours to write) ;
 2000: First AECI National Poetry Prize for " Noël, un fusil nous est né " (Christmas, a gun is born to us) ;
 2007: First Prize in Poetry " Les Manuscrits d'or " for " C'était hier " (That Was Yesterday) ;
 2007: First Prize in Short Stories " Les Manuscrits d'or " for " Confidences d'une pièce de 25 Francs " (Confessions of a 25 francs coin) ;
 2014: Tchicaya U Tam'si Prize for African Poetry for Think of Lampedusa ;
 2017: Bernard Dadié national grand prize for literature for Aux chemins de Babo Naki (Babo Naki's paths).

Other distinctions
 2012 : Knight of the Ivorian Cultural Merit

External links 
 Google books : ; 
 Prologue of Marc Laurent Turpin
 Interview Reseau Ivoire
 Article Avenue 225
Todd Fredson, « Think of Lampedusa, Translated from French », Boston Revue, October 6, 2016
John Venegas , « My country, tonight »,  Angel city revue, Los Angeles, May 9, 2017
Dexter L. Booth, « A Review of My country, tonight, Waxwing, Issue XIII, Fall 23017
Honorée Fanonne Jeffers, « Josué Guébo. My Country, Tonight », The Kenyon Review, april 2017
Todd Fredson « The Most Dangerous Crossing : Reconstituting Nationality in Josué Guébo’s Songe à Lampedusa, blackbird online journal, Fall 2016 Vol. 15 No. 2
Todd Fredson, « Josué Guébo: from My country, tonight », The Offendind Adam, review 202
Todd Fredson, « Til Death Do Us Part: Approaching Josué Guébo’s My country, tonight », Matter, Issue Fourteen, November 2015
Virginia Konchan, The Order Is Bullet
Arturo Desimone, Between the Naked Water and the Flower of the Iroko

Ivorian poets
Ivorian male writers
Male poets
1972 births
Living people
People from Abidjan
Ivorian academics
Ivorian short story writers
Male short story writers
21st-century poets
21st-century short story writers
People from Divo, Ivory Coast
21st-century male writers